Piper bullatifolium is a species of a pepper plant in the family Piperaceae. It is endemic to Ecuador.

References

Flora of Ecuador
bullatifolium
Critically endangered plants
Taxonomy articles created by Polbot